The 5th millennium BC spanned the years 5000 BC to 4001 BC (c. 7 ka to c. 6 ka). It is impossible to precisely date events that happened around the time of this millennium and all dates mentioned here are estimates mostly based on geological and anthropological analysis.

The exceptions are several neolithic pile dwellings around the Alps whose construction time can be dated to within a year.

Communities
The rapid world population growth of the previous millennium, caused by the Neolithic Revolution, is believed to have slowed and become fairly stable. It has been estimated that there were around forty million people worldwide by 5000 BC, growing to 100 million by the Middle Bronze Age c. 1600 BC.

Europe
The Cucuteni–Trypillia culture (aka Tripolye culture) began around 4800 BC. It was centred on modern Moldova and lasted in three defined phases until c. 3000 BC.

From about 4500 BC until c. 2500 BC, a single tongue called Proto-Indo-European (PIE) existed as the forerunner of all modern Indo-European languages, but it left no written texts and its structure is unknown.

China

Chinese civilisation advanced in this millennium with the beginnings of three noted cultures from around 5000 BC. The Yangshao culture was based in the Huang He (Yellow River) basin and endured for some 2,000 years. It is believed that pigs were first domesticated there. Pottery was fired in kilns dug into the ground and then painted. Millet was cultivated. A type-site settlement for the Yangshao was established c. 4700 BC at Banpo near modern Xi'an, Shaanxi.

Also about 5000 BC, the Hemudu culture began in eastern China with cultivation of rice, and the Majiabang culture was established on the Yangtze estuary near modern Shanghai, lasting until c. 3300 BC.

Australia
It is estimated that the distinctive Aboriginal rock carvings near Sydney were created sometime between 5000 BC and 3000 BC.

Africa
It is estimated that the beginning of the Pastoral Neolithic was in the later phase of the Green Sahara, in the 6th or 5th millennium BC. It was prior to the end of the African humid period (c. 3900 BC) and the desiccation of the Green Sahara. During this time, sub-Saharan Africa remained in the Palaeolithic. As the grasslands of the Sahara began drying after c. 3900 BC, herders moved into the Nile Valley and by the middle of the 3rd millennium BC into eastern Africa.

Calendars and chronology
The 5th millennium has become a startpoint for calendars and chronologies. The year 4750 BC is the retrospective startpoint for the Assyrian calendar, marking the traditional date for the foundation of Assur, some 2,000 years before it actually happened.

Another traditional date is 19 July 4241 BC, marking the supposed beginning of the Egyptian calendar, as calculated retrospectively by Eduard Meyer. The more likely startpoint is 19 July 2781 BC, one Sothic cycle later. It has generally been believed that the calendar was based on a heliacal (dawn) rising of Sirius but that view is now being questioned.

According to the Ussher chronology, the creation of Earth happened on 22/23 October 4004 BC. This chronology was the work of James Ussher, whose basis was the dates in the Old Testament of the Bible. He estimated that the universe was created by God at either 18:00 on the 22nd (Jewish calendar) or 09:00 on the 23rd (Ussher-Lightfoot-Chronology).

Yet another calendar starting date in the 5th millennium is Monday, 1 January 4713 BC, the beginning of the current Julian Period, first described by Joseph Justus Scaliger in the sixteenth century. This Julian Period lasts 7,980 years until the year 3268 (current era) in the next millennium. It is a useful device for date conversions between different calendars. The date of origin has the integer value of zero in the Julian Day Count: i.e., in the Julian Calendar; the equivalent date in the Gregorian Calendar is 24 November 4714 BC.

See also
 Northgrippian

References

 
-95